Spider-Man: Original Motion Picture Score is the soundtrack for the 2002 film Spider-Man directed by Sam Raimi. It was released on June 4, 2002. The score combines traditional orchestration, ethnic percussion and electronic elements. Its distinct ethnic characteristics are credited to its composer, Danny Elfman, who spent a year in Africa studying its unique percussive variety. A CD release of the score came out from Sony's label.

Track listing

Re-release 
In 2022, La-La Land Records announced that it would release an expanded version of the Spider-Man score on November 29, coinciding with the film's 20th anniversary. The album features several previously-unreleased and alternate tracks and cues.

Certifications

References

2002 soundtrack albums
Danny Elfman soundtracks
Spider-Man film soundtracks
Spider-Man (2002 film series)
2000s film soundtrack albums
Columbia Records soundtracks